Jake in Progress is an American sitcom television series broadcast on ABC from March 13, 2005 to January 9, 2006. Created by Austin Winsberg, the show was originally conceived as a real-time comedy; the first season was to show the first date of Jake and a woman.  This was dropped during development, and the show became more conventional and episodic. The first aired episode reflected the original plan, covering the first half-hour of a date.

Synopsis
The main character is Jake (John Stamos), a New York City publicist-to-the-stars who tries to change his womanizing ways as he tries to find the woman of his dreams. Stamos' co-stars in the show are Naomi (Wendie Malick), Jake's boss at the Magnum PR Agency; Adrian (Ian Gomez), Jake's best friend; and Patrick (Rick Hoffman), the performance artist who always appears at the most inopportune times.

Cast
 John Stamos as Jake Phillips
 Wendie Malick as Naomi Clark
 Rick Hoffman as Patrick Van Dorn
 Ian Gomez as Adrian

Reception
The show averaged 5.5 million viewers in its first season and was initially canceled. However, the network reversed course and announced the show would return as the lead-out from a highly anticipated series, Emily's Reasons Why Not. The Jake character was softened somewhat in the second season in an effort to make him more relatable. The first night of the sitcom pairing fared poorly in the ratings; after one week, ABC immediately scheduled a rerun of The Bachelor during the one-hour block for the following week, putting both shows on indefinite hiatus. ABC confirmed on May 13 that Jake had been canceled.

Episodes

Season 1 (2005)

Season 2 (2006)

References

External links
 
 

2000s American sitcoms
2005 American television series debuts
2006 American television series endings
American Broadcasting Company original programming
English-language television shows
Television shows set in New York City
Television series by 20th Century Fox Television